Bart Poelvoorde (born 18 May 1981) is a Belgian rower. He competed in the men's double sculls event at the 2008 Summer Olympics.

References

External links
 

1981 births
Living people
Belgian male rowers
Olympic rowers of Belgium
Rowers at the 2008 Summer Olympics
Sportspeople from Ostend